Bura-Pabir (also known as Bura, Burra, Bourrah, Pabir, Babir, Babur, Barburr, Mya Bura, Kwojeffa, Huve, Huviya) is a Chadic language spoken in North-eastern Nigeria by the Babur/Bura people. Dialects are Pela, Bura Pela, Hill Bura, Hyil Hawul, Bura Hyilhawul, and Plain Bura. The language is closely related to Kilba, Chibok, Margi and a few order North-eastern Nigerian Languages.

Phonology  

There are thus five laterals in Bura: , though  can be analyzed as a palatalized fricative, . Apart from this, its inventory is much like the very complex system of Margi.

Orthography 
In the 2010 Bura-English Dictionary Roger Blench proposed an orthography similar to that of Hausa includes the Latin alphabet with the addition of the letters ɓ, ɗ, ə, and ƙ. In addition, the following digraphs are used:

See also 
Bura Sign Language

Notes

References 
 World Atlas of Language Structures entry for Bura-Pabir

Biu-Mandara languages
Languages of Nigeria